Juan Conway McNabb (December 11, 1925 – February 26, 2016) was an American born bishop in the Catholic Church and served as the first bishop of the Diocese of Chulucanas in the Piura Region of Peru from 1988-2000.

Biography
John Conway McNabb was born in Beloit, Wisconsin and professed religious vows in the Order of St. Augustine. He was ordained a Catholic priest on May 24, 1952. He taught in high schools sponsored by the Augustinian Community in Chicago, Illinois and St. Louis, Missouri. On March 4, 1964, McNabb was named the first ordinary of the Prelature of Chulucanas by Pope John XXIII. He attended the third and fourth sessions of the Second Vatican Council as a voting member. 
  
When McNabb came to the area there were no telephones, roads or electricity. There were 140,000 people in the territory and almost all of them were Catholic. There were only a few diocesan priests and six Franciscan priests from Sicily. He was not fluent in Spanish and so he utilized the services of an interpreter until he became fluent.

On April 8, 1967, Pope Paul VI named McNabb Titular Bishop of Saia Maior, and he was ordained a bishop on June 17, 1967. Archbishop John Patrick Cody of Chicago was the ordaining prelate. Bishop Petrus Canisius Jean van Lierde of the Roman Curia and Archbishop Erasmo Hinojosa Hurtado of Piura were the principal co-consecrators. On December 12, 1988, John Paul II raised the prelature to a diocese and McNabb became its first bishop.
   
Because so many of the people in the diocese lived a long way from parish churches or chapels, and there were so few priests to minister to them, a pastoral plan was developed to establish small Christian communities and train lay people as catechists. McNabb stated, "When I left (Chulucanas), there was only one priest for every 14,000 people, but you had 23,000 of the laity collaborating on parish ministry in a common program. So, there was someone in ministry for every 23 people."

McNabb had coronary artery bypass surgery in 1990 and in 1996 Daniel Thomas Turley Murphy was named coadjutor bishop of the diocese. Pope John Paul II accepted McNabb's resignation on October 28, 2000, and he returned to the United States. After he left Chulucanas he ministered among Latinos in Illinois, and then became pastor of St. Clare of Montefalco parish in Grosse Pointe Park, Michigan in 2002.

Death
McNabb died on February 26, 2016, aged 90 at Mercy Circle in Evergreen Park, Illinois from congestive heart failure.

See also

References

1925 births
2016 deaths
American Roman Catholic missionaries
Roman Catholic missionaries in Peru
20th-century Roman Catholic bishops in Peru
Participants in the Second Vatican Council
American emigrants to Peru
People from Beloit, Wisconsin
Augustinian bishops
Catholics from Wisconsin
Roman Catholic bishops of Chulucanas